The 1947 Campeonato Paulista da Primeira Divisão, organized by the Federação Paulista de Futebol, was the 46th season of São Paulo's top professional football league. Palmeiras won the title for the 11th time. no teams were relegated and the top scorer was Corinthians's Servílio with 20 goals.

Championship
The championship was disputed in a double-round robin system, with the team with the most points winning the title.

Top Scores

References

Campeonato Paulista seasons
Paulista